Vitaly Georgiyevich Atyushov (born July 4, 1979) is a Russian former professional ice hockey defenceman who played in the Kontinental Hockey League (KHL). Atyushov was drafted 276th overall in the 9th round by the Ottawa Senators in the 2002 NHL Entry Draft.

On July 7, 2014, Atyushov left Atlant Moscow Oblast after the 2013–14 season, and signed a one-year contract as a free agent with Traktor Chelyabinsk. After one season with Chelyabinsk, Atyushov continued his playing career in agreeing to a one-year deal with Amur Khabarovsk on August 12, 2015.

Career statistics

Regular season and playoffs

International

References

External links 

 Vitaly Atyushov player profile and career stats at RussianProspects.com

1979 births
Living people
Ak Bars Kazan players
Amur Khabarovsk players
Atlant Moscow Oblast players
Krylya Sovetov Moscow players
Metallurg Magnitogorsk players
Molot-Prikamye Perm players
HC Neftekhimik Nizhnekamsk players
Ottawa Senators draft picks
Russian ice hockey defencemen
Salavat Yulaev Ufa players
Traktor Chelyabinsk players